Phytoecia schurmanni is a species of beetle in the family Cerambycidae. It was described by Ernst Fuchs in 1971. It is known from Macedonia.

References

Phytoecia
Beetles described in 1971